USS Patrol, usually but not always followed by a numerical designation, has been the name of more than one United States Navy ship, and may refer to:

 , a former United States Coast Guard cutter in commission as a patrol vessel from 1918 to 1919
 , often rendered as USS Patrol #1, a patrol vessel in commission from 1917 to 1919
 , often rendered as USS Patrol #2, a patrol vessel in commission from 1917 to 1919
 , often rendered as USS Patrol #4, a patrol vessel in commission from 1917 to 1919
 , often rendered as USS Patrol #5, a patrol vessel in commission from 1917 to 1919
 , often rendered as USS Patrol #6, a patrol vessel in commission from 1917 to 1919
 , often rendered as USS Patrol #7, a patrol vessel in commission from 1917 to 1919
 , often rendered as USS Patrol #8, a patrol vessel in commission from 1917 to 1919
 , often rendered as USS Patrol #10, a patrol vessel in commission from 1917 to 1919
 , often rendered as USS Patrol #11, a patrol vessel in commission from 1917 to 1918

A private motorboat named Patrol No. 3 in existence at the time of the U.S. participation in World War I (1917–1918) was never taken over by the U.S. Navy.

United States Navy ship names